The 1997 IBF World Championships (Badminton) were held in Glasgow, Scotland, between 24 May and 1 June 1997.

Venue
Scotstoun Centre

Medalists

Medal table

Events

External links
BWF Results

 
World Championships
Badminton
Badminton
International sports competitions in Glasgow
Badminton tournaments in Scotland
BWF World Championships